KMJI (93.3 FM) is a radio station broadcasting an urban contemporary format. Licensed to Ashdown, Arkansas, United States, it serves the Texarkana area.  The station is currently owned by Townsquare Media.  Studios are located on Arkansas Boulevard in Texarkana, Arkansas and its transmitter is in Red Lick, Texas.

History
On September 15, 2017, KMJI changed their format from hot adult contemporary to urban adult contemporary, branded as "Majic 93-3". The station has since shifted more towards an urban contemporary format with a mix of current hip hop and gospel in some shows.

Previous logo

References

External links
KMJI Majic 93.3 Official Website

MJI
Urban contemporary radio stations in the United States
Townsquare Media radio stations
Radio stations established in 1985
1985 establishments in Arkansas